Lesbian, gay, bisexuals, and transgender (LGBT) persons in Transnistria face legal challenges not experienced by non-LGBT residents. The Pridnestrovian Moldavian Republic (PMR) is an unrecognised breakaway state with its own judicial system. For the legal situation for LGBT individuals in Moldova, which Transnistria is recognised by most states as belonging to, see LGBT rights in Moldova.

Law regarding same-sex sexual activity

Consensual same-sex sexual activity is legal in Transnistria, despite many foreign sources saying that it is illegal. Article 131 of the Criminal Code of Transnistria that came into force in June 2002, states that committing sodomy, lesbianism and sexual intercourse with a person under the age of sixteen is illegal. However, the article does not state that committing 'sodomy and lesbianism' above 16 is illegal. All the other articles related to sex crimes, such as sexual assault and coercion to perform sexual acts, have listed '(heterosexual) sexual intercourse, sodomy and lesbianism' in the same category. There are no other articles in the Criminal Code of Transnistria that have laws that are separated in penalizing same-sex sexual activity, or committing 'sodomy and lesbianism.'

Despite this, LGBT individuals are subject to governmental and societal discrimination.

Recognition of same-sex unions
Transnistria does not recognize same-sex unions. The Code of Marriage and Family that came into force in 2002 states that marriage is a voluntary marital union between a man and a woman. The Code does not recognize other types of partnership for both opposite-sex and same-sex couples other than marriage.

Summary table

See also

Human rights in Transnistria
LGBT rights in Moldova
LGBT rights in Russia
LGBT rights in Europe

References

 
Transnistria
Politics of Transnistria